George Western Thompson (May 14, 1806 – February 24, 1888) was a nineteenth-century Virginia politician, lawyer and judge. He served one term in the U.S. House of Representatives, resigning to become a state judge. During the American Civil War Judge Thompson resigned that position as because he believed the creation of West Virginia to be illegal.

Early and family life
Born in St. Clairsville, Ohio, Thompson graduated from Jefferson College in 1824, then studied law in Richmond, Virginia.

He married Elizabeth Steenrod (1817-1897). They had four sons, none of whom survived their mother, and two daughters. Their sons included Confederate Col. William P. Thompson (1837-1896, who became a vice president of Standard Oil as well as president of the Lead Trust); Lewis Thompson (1833-1918); George Western Thompson (1846-1895, who served a president of the Ohio River Railroad, and was married to Frances Belle Jackson, daughter of General John Jay Jackson); and Daniel Steenrod Thompson (1853-1893). His daughter Anna Gaither Thompson married Johnson Newlon Camden who became a prominent industrialist, banker and railroad organizer in West Virginia and U.S. Senator, although both his gubernatorial runs failed.

Career
After admission to the Ohio bar in 1826, Thompson began his legal practice in St. Clairsville in 1828 under the guidance of William Blackstone Hubbard (a freemason).

He moved across the Ohio River to Wheeling Virginia in 1837; and afterwards he was approved by President Martin van Buren based on  postmaster general Amos Kendall's recommemdation (political patronage), to be the deputy postmaster of Wheeling, Virginia (now West Virginia) in 1838. In the 1840s George was appointed to a Virginia government commission to settle jurisdiction of the Ohio River between Virginia and Ohio.

President James K. Polk appointed George Thompson United States Attorney for the western district of Virginia; and he served in this capacity from 1848 to 1850 until political winds changed and forced him out.

A Democrat, Thompson won election to the United States House of Representatives in 1850, serving from 1851 until his resignation in 1852 when the Virginia General Assembly elected him judge of the circuit court. As both Congressman and state judge, he was involved in cases involving the Wheeling Suspension Bridge (completed in 1849) and a nearby railroad bridge which helped Wheeling become an important gateway city between the Ohio River valley and Eastern and international markets. As Congressman, Thompson introduced documents supporting the bridge (including resolutions of the Ohio and Virginia state legislatures), which impeded large steamboats to Pittsburgh. Congress passed a law declaring it a post road, so it was not torn down despite the United States Supreme Court finding it impeded Ohio River navigation. Virginia's General Assembly reelected Thompson as circuit judge in 1860.

However, after Virginia voters in May 1861 approved the ordinance of secession which had been passed by the Virginia Secession Convention of 1861 despite the Unionist stance of most delegates from northwestern Virginia (including near Wheeling), Unionists attended the Wheeling Convention which established the Restored Government of Virginia. Thompson was removed from office in 1861 by the newly appointed "loyal" governor of Virginia, Francis H. Pierpont, for refusing to take the [oath of allegiance to the union and "the Restored Government of Virginia"]. He objected to support the Restored Government of Virginia since he considered it an unelected, unconstitutional maneuever to set up the present State of West Virginia. Ralph Lazier Berkshire, whom he had defeated in the judicial contest and who supported West Virginia's statehood, would be elected his successor and later first chief justice of the West Virginia Supreme Court of Appeals.

His son William P. Thompson, who had become a lawyer in Virginia in 1857, recruited the "Marion Greys" and became a colonel of the 19th Virginia Infantry. Another son, George Western Thompson (1846-1895), became involved with the Ohio River Railroad and served as president until his death in 1895. After the war, William Thompson joined with his brother-in-law and another man and became president of the Camden Consolidated Oil Company, which in 1881 merged into Standard Oil Company, of which Thompson became vice-president and moved to Cleveland, Ohio.

Death and legacy
Meanwhile, Judge Thompson retired to his estate near Wheeling, West Virginia where he eventually died on February 24, 1888. He was interred there in Stone Church cemetery in Elm Grove.

References

1806 births
1888 deaths
Virginia lawyers
Virginia state court judges
Virginia postmasters
Washington & Jefferson College alumni
People from St. Clairsville, Ohio
Politicians from Wheeling, West Virginia
United States Attorneys for the Western District of Virginia
Democratic Party members of the United States House of Representatives from Virginia
19th-century American politicians
Lawyers from Wheeling, West Virginia
19th-century American judges
19th-century American lawyers
Virginia circuit court judges